This article comprises three sortable tables of major mountain peaks of the U.S. State of Alaska.

The summit of a mountain or hill may be measured in three principal ways:
The topographic elevation of a summit measures the height of the summit above a geodetic sea level.  The first table below ranks the 100 highest major summits of Alaska by elevation.
The topographic prominence of a summit is a measure of how high the summit rises above its surroundings.  The second table below ranks the 100 most prominent summits of Alaska.
The topographic isolation (or radius of dominance) of a summit measures how far the summit lies from its nearest point of equal elevation.  The third table below ranks the 50 most isolated major summits of Alaska.



Highest major summits

Of the 100 highest major summits of Alaska, only Denali exceeds  elevation, four peaks exceed , 23 peaks exceed , 61 peaks exceed , and 92 peaks exceed  elevation.  Five of these peaks lie on the international border with Yukon and five lie on the international border with British Columbia.  All ten of the highest major summits of the United States are in Alaska.

Most prominent summits

Of the 100 most prominent summits of Alaska, only Denali exceeds  of topographic prominence, six peaks exceed , 26 peaks exceed , and 65 peaks are ultra-prominent summits with at least  of topographic prominence.  Four of these peaks lie on the international border with British Columbia and four lie on the international border with Yukon.

Most isolated major summits

Of the 50 most isolated major summits of Alaska, only Denali exceeds  of topographic isolation, four peaks exceed , 16 peaks exceed , and 38 peaks exceed  of topographic isolation.  Two of these peaks lie on the international border with British Columbia.

Gallery

See also

List of mountain peaks of North America
List of mountain peaks of Greenland
List of mountain peaks of Canada
List of mountain peaks of the Rocky Mountains
List of mountain peaks of the United States

List of mountains of Alaska
List of the major 4000-meter summits of Alaska
List of the ultra-prominent summits of Alaska
List of mountain peaks of Arizona
List of mountain peaks of California
List of mountain peaks of Colorado
List of mountain peaks of Hawaii
List of mountain peaks of Idaho
List of mountain peaks of Montana
List of mountain peaks of Nevada
List of mountain peaks of New Mexico
List of mountain peaks of Oregon
List of mountain peaks of Utah
List of mountain peaks of Washington (state)
List of mountain peaks of Wyoming
List of mountain peaks of México
List of mountain peaks of Central America
List of mountain peaks of the Caribbean
Alaska
Geography of Alaska
:Category:Mountains of Alaska
commons:Category:Mountains of Alaska
Physical geography
Topography
Topographic elevation
Topographic prominence
Topographic isolation

Notes

References

External links

United States Geological Survey (USGS)
Geographic Names Information System @ USGS
United States National Geodetic Survey (NGS)
Geodetic Glossary @ NGS
NGVD 29 to NAVD 88 online elevation converter @ NGS
Survey Marks and Datasheets @ NGS
United States National Park Service (NPS)
Highest Alaskan Summits @ NPS
Bivouac.com
Peakbagger.com
Peaklist.org
Peakware.com
Summitpost.org

 

Lists of landforms of Alaska
Alaska, List Of Mountain Peaks Of
Alaska, List Of Mountain Peaks Of
Alaska, List Of Mountain Peaks Of
Alaska, List Of Mountain Peaks Of